Joseph Hooley (born 26 December 1938 in Hoyland) is an English former footballer and football manager.

He played for Barnsley, Sheffield United, Workington, Holbeach United, Bradford Park Avenue, Bedford Town, Accrington Stanley and Dover Town.

He managed Keflavík, Molde FK, Lillestrøm and Bodø/Glimt.

References

Living people
English footballers
Barnsley F.C. players
Sheffield United F.C. players
Workington A.F.C. players
Holbeach United F.C. players
Bradford (Park Avenue) A.F.C. players
Bedford Town F.C. players
Accrington Stanley F.C. (1891) players
English football managers
Expatriate football managers in Iceland
English expatriate sportspeople in Norway
Expatriate football managers in Norway
Lillestrøm SK managers
Molde FK managers
FK Bodø/Glimt managers
1938 births
Knattspyrnudeild Keflavík managers
Association football midfielders